Paul Portier was a French cinematographer. He worked on around fifty films during his career.

Selected filmography
 Imperial Violets (1924)
 The Woman in Gold (1926)
 The Song of the Nations (1931)
 A Happy Man (1932)
 Baroud (1932)
 The Novel of Werther (1938)
 Three Waltzes (1938)
 There's No Tomorrow (1939)
 Musicians of the Sky (1940)
 The Acrobat (1941)

References

Bibliography
 Powrie, Phil & Rebillard, Éric. Pierre Batcheff and stardom in 1920s French cinema. Edinburgh University Press, 2009.

External links

Year of birth unknown
Year of death unknown
French cinematographers